The Draughts African Championship is the championship in international draughts (international checkers), organised by the World Draughts Federation (FMJD) and African Draughts Confederation (CAJD). The winner of championship and next three or four players automatically classified into the Draughts World Championship in international draughts.

First championship was in 1980. The winner was Bassirou Ba from Senegal. Since 2014 championship took place at blitz.

In 2018 took place first women's championship.

Results

Blitz

Women's

References

External links
African Championship at toernooibase KNDB
Site FMJD. American Champions (100)

African Championship
Sport-related lists